The Faith and Liberty Discovery Center (FLDC) is a new museum owned and operated by American Bible Society on Philadelphia's Independence Mall. It opened in May 2021 and focuses on the impact of the Bible on the men and women who built America—from the Founders, through abolitionists and suffragists, celebrating the civil rights activists, and continuing to the present day.

The 40,000 square-foot, $60 million project  was designed by Local Projects, the firm that designed the National September 11 Memorial & Museum. Local Projects created technology for all visitors, including a lamp, that helps tailor their experiences. In  2021, Local Projects and the FLDC were named for exhibition design of the year in the Dezeen Awards 2021 public vote. Architectural design was led by the Philadelphia principals of JacobsWyper Architects' SaylorGregg Studio.

Tickets cost $10 for adults and $8 for children ages 7–17.

See also 

American Bible Society

References

External links

Bible-themed museums, zoos, and botanical gardens
History museums in the United States
Museums in Philadelphia
Museums established in 2021